Evgenia Tur (24 August 1815 – 27 March 1892) was a Russian writer, critic, journalist and publisher. Her birth name was Elizaveta Vasilyevna Sukhovo-Kobylina. Her full married name was Countess Elizaveta Vasilyevna Salias De Tournemire. The novelist Evgeny Salias De Tournemire was her son. The playwright Aleksandr Sukhovo-Kobylin was her brother. Her sister, Sofia, was a painter of some note.

Early years

Elizaveta was born in Moscow into a noble family. Her father was Vasily Sukhovo-Kobylin (1782–1873), a veteran of the Napoleonic wars, and Marshal of the Nobility for the Podolsk district, Moscow province. Her mother was Maria Ivanovna Sukhovo-Kobylina, née Shepeleva (1789–1862).

Elizaveta received a good education at home. Her teachers were various professors from Moscow University.

As a young woman she had a romantic relationship with a man of lower social status named Nikolay Ivanovich Nadezhdin. They wanted to get married but Elizaveta's parents sharply opposed her marriage, seeing Nikolay as being unworthy of their daughter's hand. Elizaveta and Nikolay wanted to get married secretly, but their plan failed. Elizaveta was soon taken abroad by her parents.

In 1838, in France, Elizaveta married Count Andrey Salias de Tournemire, a nobleman from a very old French family, dating back to the year 1264. Soon the young countess and her husband returned to Russia and settled in Moscow.

In 1846, Andrey was expelled from Russia for participating in a duel. He went alone, virtually abandoning his wife and three children.

Literary career

After the departure of her husband, Elizaveta began to lead an emancipated life. She became interested in literature, and arranged a literary salon that was considered one of the best in Moscow at that time. The salon was frequented by many popular writers and literary figures including Ivan Turgenev, Alexander Levitov, Vasily Sleptsov, Nikolai Leskov, Konstantin Leontiev, Nikolay Ogarev and others.

She soon took up the pen herself. Her first work of fiction was published in The Contemporary, under the pen name Evgenia Tur. Her debut was a great success. Her novel was favorably reviewed by Aleksandr Ostrovsky, who welcomed the birth of "a new and original talent". He acknowledged that the novel was well written and that the characters for the most part were skillfully drawn and true to reality, but pointed to the only drawback that he saw- the redundancy of long descriptions and arguments.

The following year she published another novel The Niece (also in The Contemporary) which was greeted enthusiastically by readers and critics. Ivan Turgenev wrote that she had exited great hopes in the literary world and that her talent and abilities were able to withstand rigorous assessment. In the next few years, Elizaveta published many new works, including Duty and Two Sisters (1851), Vicious Circle (1854), Old Lady (1856), At the Turn (1857), and Flower Girl (1859).

Critical and journalistic activities

In 1856, Elizaveta became the head of the fictional department of The Russian Messenger. In this magazine, starting in 1857, she began to publish critical articles and periodicals devoted to the life and work of foreign writers. She worked for the Russian Messenger for almost 4 years before leaving in 1860 because of controversy with the editor. The critic Dmitry Pisarev, at this time period, stated that the Russian Messenger "didn't respect the intellectual independence of its employees."

In 1861 she established her own journal Russian Speech (the magazine, however, lasted only 13 months) in which she published several critical articles on such writers as Nadezhda Khvoshchinskaya and Fyodor Dostoyevsky. It was clear to her even at this early date that Dostoyevsky possessed great talent. She also published critical articles in the journals Reader's Library, Notes of the Fatherland and the newspaper Northern Bee.

Of literary-historical interest is her critical essay on Ivan Turgenev's novel Fathers and Sons published in Northern Bee. Although she had been friends with Turgenev, and had celebrated his writing, she responded to Fathers and Sons with scorn and indignation. It was her view that the young people of Russia were much better and stronger than Turgenev had portrayed them. In her opinion, he had embodied the good exceptions of the old generation in the fathers, and the ugliest exceptions of the young generation in the sons.

Later years

In 1861 Elizaveta's life underwent considerable change. Her son Evgeny was involved in the prevalent student unrest of the time. Elizaveta, albeit of moderate-liberal positions, made no secret of her sympathy for young people. She was also deeply concerned with relations between Poland and Russia, and was strongly influenced by the ideas of Polish Professor Henryk Wyziński (1834 - 1879), who often attended her salon. During this time, she was placed under secret police surveillance. In early 1862 she was forced to leave for France where she lived in Paris for several years. Here she developed close ties to the Polish aristocracy, and became interested in issues of religion, especially Catholicism, which largely determined the evolution of her work.

After leaving Russia, she wrote mainly novels and stories for children and youth: Catacombs (1866), Crystal Heart (1873), The Shalonski Family (1879), The Last Days of Pompeii (1882), The Sacred History of the Old Testament (1888) and other books are very popular and frequently reprinted in modern Russia.

She spent her last years living in Warsaw, where she died in March 1892.

English translations
The Shalonski Family, (novel), Remington and Co, London, 1882. from Google Books
Antonina, (novel), Northwestern University Press, 1996.

References

1815 births
1892 deaths
Women writers from the Russian Empire
Russian women novelists
Russian women short story writers
Russian children's writers
Russian critics
Journalists from the Russian Empire
Russian women journalists
Russian publishers (people)
Writers from Moscow
Russian nobility
French countesses
Russian women children's writers
Russian women critics
19th-century women writers from the Russian Empire
19th-century writers from the Russian Empire
19th-century journalists from the Russian Empire
19th-century novelists from the Russian Empire
20th-century Russian women writers
19th-century short story writers from the Russian Empire
20th-century Russian short story writers